Culinary Genius is a British ITV cooking entertainment program created and produced by Gordon Ramsay.

United States adaptation
In May 2017, Gordon Ramsay announced that the series will be adapted for American television as part of their deal with 20th Century Fox Television and its producer All3Media; the half-hour series was picked up by Fox Television Stations as part of a three-week summer test run, former Dancing with the Stars host and current weekend co-anchor of Entertainment Tonight Samantha Harris is the host of the American version with Edward Lee serves as the chef judge and Ramsay serves as the executive producer for the US version. The US adaptation was aired from August 7 to 25, 2017.

References

External links

2017 British television series debuts
2017 British television series endings
2010s British cooking television series
British cooking television shows
English-language television shows
ITV (TV network) original programming
Television series by All3Media
Television shows set in England
Television shows set in London